Blow is a live album by singer-songwriter Heather Nova, released in 1993.

Track listing
All songs written by Heather Nova.

"Light Years" – 5:24
"Sugar" – 6:48
"Maybe an Angel" – 6:31
"Blessed" – 2:37
"Mothertongue" – 3:21
"Talking to Strangers" – 5:05
"Shaking the Doll" – 4:16
"Frontier" – 5:17
"Doubled Up" – 3:40

Personnel
Heather Nova – guitar, vocals
David Ayers – guitar
Maz de Chastelaine – cello
Nadia Lanman – cello (1, 8 & 9)
Dean McCormick – drums (1, 8 & 9)
Cocoa Solid – bass
Richard Thair – drums

Production
Felix Tod – producer
KK, Felix Tod – engineers
Caroline Smith – design
Heather Nova – illustrations
Kevin Westenberg – photography

References

Heather Nova albums
1993 live albums